Albert I of Habsburg (July 12551 May 1308) was a Duke of Austria and Styria from 1282 and King of Germany from 1298 until his assassination. He was the eldest son of King Rudolf I of Germany and his first wife Gertrude of Hohenberg. Sometimes referred to as 'Albert the One-eyed' because of a battle injury that left him with a hollow eye socket and a permanent snarl.

Biography

From 1273 Albert ruled as a landgrave over his father's Swabian (Further Austrian) possessions in Alsace. In 1282 his father, the first German monarch from the House of Habsburg, invested him and his younger brother Rudolf II with the duchies of Austria and Styria, which he had seized from late King Ottokar II of Bohemia and defended in the 1278 Battle on the Marchfeld. By the 1283 Treaty of Rheinfelden his father entrusted Albert with their sole government, while Rudolf II ought to be compensated by the Further Austrian Habsburg home territories – which, however, never happened until his death in 1290. Albert and his Swabian ministeriales appear to have ruled the Austrian and Styrian duchies with conspicuous success, overcoming the resistance by local nobles.

King Rudolf I was unable to secure the succession to the German throne for his son, especially due to the objections raised by Ottokar's son King Wenceslaus II of Bohemia, and the plans to install Albert as successor of the assassinated King Ladislaus IV of Hungary in 1290 also failed. Upon Rudolf's death in 1291, the Prince-electors, fearing Albert's power and the implementation of a hereditary monarchy, chose Count Adolf of Nassau-Weilburg as King of the Romans. An uprising among his Styrian dependents compelled Albert to recognize the sovereignty of his rival and to confine himself for a time to the government of the Habsburg lands at Vienna.

He did not abandon his hopes of the throne, however, which were eventually realised: In 1298, he was chosen German king by some of the princes, who were bothered about Adolf's attempts to gain his own power bases in the lands of Thuringia and Meissen, again led by the Bohemian king Wenceslaus II.  The armies of the rival kings met at the Battle of Göllheim near Worms, where Adolf was defeated and slain. Submitting to a new election but securing the support of several influential princes by making extensive promises, he was chosen at the Imperial City of Frankfurt on 27 July 1298, and crowned at Aachen Cathedral on 24 August.

Although a hard, stern man, Albert had a keen sense of justice when his own interests were not involved, and few of the German kings possessed so practical an intelligence.  He encouraged the cities, and not content with issuing proclamations against private war, formed alliances with the princes in order to enforce his decrees.  The serfs, whose wrongs seldom attracted notice in an age indifferent to the claims of common humanity, found a friend in this severe monarch, and he protected even the despised and persecuted Jews.  Stories of his cruelty and oppression in the Swiss cantons (cf. William Tell) did not appear until the 16th century, and are now regarded as legendary. 

Albert sought to play an important part in European affairs.  He seemed at first inclined to press a quarrel with the Kingdom of France over the Burgundian frontier, but the refusal of Pope Boniface VIII to recognize his election led him to change his policy, and, in 1299, he made a treaty with King Philip IV, by which his son Rudolph was to marry Blanche, a daughter of the French king.  He afterwards became estranged from Philip, but in 1303, Boniface recognized him as German king and future emperor; in return, Albert recognized the authority of the pope alone to bestow the Imperial crown, and promised that none of his sons should be elected German king without papal consent.

Albert had failed in his attempt to seize the counties of Holland and Zeeland, as vacant fiefs of the Holy Roman Empire, on the death of Count John I in 1299, but in 1306 he secured the crown of Bohemia for his son Rudolph III on the death of King Wenceslaus III. He also renewed the claim made by his predecessor, Adolf, on Thuringia, and interfered in a quarrel over the succession to the Hungarian throne.  The Thuringian attack ended in Albert's defeat at the Battle of Lucka in 1307 and, in the same year, the death of his son Rudolph weakened his position in eastern Europe.  His action in abolishing all tolls established on the Rhine since 1250 led the Rhenish prince-archbishops and the Elector of the Palatinate to form a league against him. Aided by the Imperial cities, however, he soon crushed the rising.

He was on the way to suppress a revolt in Swabia when he was murdered on 1 May 1308, at Windisch on the Reuss, by his nephew Duke John, afterwards called "the Parricide" or "John Parricida", whom he had deprived of his inheritance.

Titles 
Albert, by the grace of God, King of the Romans, Duke of Austria and Styria, Lord of Carniola, over the Wendish Mark and of Port Naon, Count of Habsburg and Kyburg, Landgrave of Alsace''

Marriage and children 
In 1274, Albert had married Elizabeth, daughter of Count Meinhard II of Tyrol, who was a descendant of the Babenberg margraves of Austria who predated the Habsburgs' rule. The baptismal name Leopold, patron saint margrave of Austria, was given to one of their sons. Queen Elizabeth was in fact better connected to mighty German rulers than her husband: she was a descendant of earlier German kings, including Emperor Henry IV; she was also a niece of the Wittelsbach dukes of Bavaria, Austria's important neighbor.

Albert and Elizabeth had twelve children:
 Anna (1275, Vienna19 March 1327, Breslau), married:
 in Graz  to Herman, Margrave of Brandenburg-Salzwedel;
 in Breslau 1310 to Henry VI the Good, Duke of Wrocław.
 Agnes (18 May 128110 June 1364, Königsfelden), married in Vienna 13 February 1296 King Andrew III of Hungary.
 Rudolph III (4 July 1307, Horažďovice) married but line extinct and predeceased his father.
 Elizabeth (128519 May 1353), married 1304 Frederick IV, Duke of Lorraine.
 Frederick I (128913 January 1330, Gutenstein) married but line extinct.
 Leopold I (4 August 129028 February 1326, Strassburg) married, had issue.
 Catherine (129518 January 1323, Naples), married Charles, Duke of Calabria in  1316.
 Albert II (12 December 1298, Vienna20 July 1358, Vienna).
 Henry the Gentle (12993 February 1327, Bruck an der Mur) married but line extinct.
 Meinhard (13001301), died in infancy.
 Otto (23 July 1301, Vienna26 February 1339, Vienna) married but line extinct.
 Jutta (13025 March 1329), married Ludwig V, Count of Öttingen in Baden, 26 March 1319.

References

External links
The poem , by Felicia Hemans recalls the scene of Albert's death, where he was supposedly comforted by a passing peasant woman. From Friendship's Offering annual, 1826.

Sources

 Citations:

1255 births
1308 deaths
13th-century House of Habsburg
13th-century Kings of the Romans
13th-century dukes of Austria
14th-century Kings of the Romans
14th-century murdered monarchs
14th-century dukes of Austria
Assassinated German people
Burials at Speyer Cathedral
Deaths by blade weapons
Landgraves of Thuringia
Margraves of Meissen
Pretenders to the Hungarian throne